Orlyanka is a rural locality (a settlement) in Vablinsky Selsoviet Rural Settlement, Konyshyovsky District, Kursk Oblast, Russia. Population:

Geography 
The settlement is located on the Vablya River (a tributary of the Prutishche in the basin of the Seym), 75 km from the Russia–Ukraine border, 56 km north-west of Kursk, 18 km north-west of the district center – the urban-type settlement Konyshyovka, 1.5 km from the selsoviet center – Vablya.

 Climate
Orlyanka has a warm-summer humid continental climate (Dfb in the Köppen climate classification).

Transport 
Orlyanka is located 27.5 km from the federal route  Crimea Highway, 13 km from the road of regional importance  (Fatezh – Dmitriyev), 3.5 km from the road  (Konyshyovka – Zhigayevo – 38K-038), 0.5 km from the road of intermunicipal significance  (38K-005 – Ryzhkovo – Lukyanchikovo), 14 km from the nearest railway station Sokovninka (railway line Navlya – Lgov-Kiyevsky).

The rural locality is situated 61 km from Kursk Vostochny Airport, 165 km from Belgorod International Airport and 260 km from Voronezh Peter the Great Airport.

References

Notes

Sources

Rural localities in Konyshyovsky District
Dmitriyevsky Uyezd